Byrraju (Telugu: బైర్రాజు) is an Indian surname.
 Byrraju Foundation, charitable organisation in India.
 Byrraju Ramalinga Raju, former director of Satyam Computers.

Indian surnames